Birkenfelde is a municipality in the district of Eichsfeld, in Thuringia, Germany.

References

Eichsfeld (district)